Space Gate is the fourth album by German eurodance group Mr. President, released in 1999. This album features two hit singles: "Give a Little Love" and "Simbaleo".

Track listing

Charts

References

1999 albums
Mr. President (band) albums